Locus is the name of two fictional characters appearing in American comic books published by Marvel Comics. The first one, whose real name is Aaron Verne, first appeared in Thor #302 (Dec. 1980), and has the ability to create geometric energy constructs.

The second one is a mutant villainess. She was first introduced as a member of the Mutant Liberation Front in the comic title X-Force under the leadership of Reignfire. She has been portrayed inconsistently with a variety of ethnic features, prior to her death.

Fictional character biography
After the Mutant Liberation Front (MLF) were incarcerated by the United States government following the events of the X-Cutioner's Song crossover, a tyrannical despot named Reignfire decides to restart the MLF. He breaks Forearm, Reaper, Wildside, and Tempo out of prison and gives them their first mission: kill Henry Peter Gyrich. With the addition of Locus - at this point drawn and colored as a Caucasian with blonde hair and a white, downward arrow sometimes painted on her face- and Moonstar, the team is sent on their way, however their assassination attempt is foiled by X-Force. When Locus tries to kill Gyrich, Sunspot jumps in the way and something unexpected happens: the two mutants' powers react and send the pair disappearing to parts unknown. Due to the nature of Locus' powers and Sunspot's well-traveled tenure with both the New Mutants and X-Force the couple could be virtually anywhere in the galaxy. Cable and the rest of X-Force attempted to search for Sunspot using a modified version of Cerebro, but they have no luck.

After six months of searching, Locus mysteriously appears at X-Force's base. She claims to have been to the farthest reaches of space, and was surprised that they had only been gone for six months, as it seemed like longer. She had even had enough time to learn the Kree language. At this time, Reignfire begins to hunt down his followers, taking Wildside and Forearm out first. All would have been lost if not for X-Force and Locus teleporting in to stop the madman.

In their last appearance, the MLF once again is trying to steal data on the Legacy Virus, this time from a government institution who is trying to manufacture their own strain of the disease. They infiltrate the building and take the scientists hostage, but—once again through the sabotaging efforts of Moonstar—X-Force is let in the building to try to stop them. During the hostile takeover, Wildside and Locus get in an argument and he slaps her on the face. Infuriated, she teleports away, not knowing that by doing so she saved herself some prison time. It turns out that three of the scientists reveal themselves to be Prime Sentinels and begin to attack. The two groups pool their resources to try to survive, but only X-Force—with Moonstar and Forearm in tow—manage to escape. The remaining members of the MLF are captured by operatives of Operation: Zero Tolerance.

When next she surfaced she was portrayed as an African-American, still working with the recently alive and sentient Reignfire. They attempt to capture Sunspot, who is visiting his former teammate Skids in college. In another strange twist of fate, Locus' powers adversely interact with Skids' force field and the two women are transported to the Balkan country of Latveria. The pair are then captured by an age-old sorceress named Pandemonia, the self-styled Queen of Chaos, who sought to recruit mutants into her own personal army. However, X-Force, with the assistance of the young sorceress Jennifer Kale, manage to defeat Pandemonia and rescue their ally.

Locus' final moment is when the revamped Weapon X Program began to get underway. The Program had meant to recruit Locus as a much-needed teleporter, and sent new agent Washout and Brent Jackson to do so. But an enraged Sabretooth—who had stolen the Weapon X files and escaped from the Program—had killed the young girl to spite them, and they arrived to find her body.

Powers and abilities
Locus has the ability to teleport herself, other people, or other objects she is in physical contact with, to anywhere that she, or they, have been before. This makes her different from other teleporters like Nightcrawler who can teleport himself to anywhere in his range he can visualize. She also has the ability to levitate. She has the ability to select parts of people or objects (say a hand or head), and teleport them away, leaving the rest behind, often with deadly results. She also displayed the power to fire energy blasts.

References

External links
 UncannyXmen.net Character Profile on Locus

Comics characters introduced in 1993
Characters created by Fabian Nicieza
Fictional African-American people
Marvel Comics characters who can teleport
Marvel Comics mutants
Marvel Comics female supervillains